Isaac Donald Everly (February 1, 1937 – August 21, 2021) was an American Musician, who was one half of the duo The Everly Brothers alongside his younger brother Phil.

Early life
Don was born in Brownie, Kentucky in 1937 to Isaac Milford "Ike" Everly, Jr. (1908–1975), a guitar player, and Margaret Embry Everly (1919–2021).

The Everly family moved to Knoxville, Tennessee, in 1953, where the brothers attended West High School. In 1955, the family moved to Madison, Tennessee, while the brothers moved to Nashville. Don graduated from high school in 1955.

Career

The Everly Brothers

The Everly Brothers Career started in 1951. They signed to Cadence Records In 1957. Their first hit was Bye Bye Love, that had been rejected by 30 other acts. 

Bye Bye Love went to no. 2 on the pop charts, behind Elvis Presley's "(Let Me Be Your) Teddy Bear", and No. 1 on the country and No. 5 on the R&B charts. The song, by Felice and Boudleaux Bryant, became the Everly Brothers' first million-seller.

The Everly Brothers are remembered for other major hits such as Cathy’s Clown And All I Have To Do Is Dream.

After the duo split following conflicts between the two brothers, Phil and Don pursued solo careers from 1973 to 1983. The brothers' reunited at the Royal Albert Hall in London on September 23, 1983, which ended their ten-year-long hiatus. The event was initiated by Phil and Don alongside Terry Slater, with Wingfield as musical director. This concert was recorded for a live LP and video broadcast on cable television in mid-January 1984. The brothers returned to the studio as a duo for the first time in over a decade, recording the album EB '84, produced by Dave Edmunds.

The Everly Brothers were inducted into the Rock and Roll Hall of Fame in 1986. They were the first duo and non-solo act to have been inducted. That same year, they received a star on the Hollywood walk of fame.

Their final charting single was 1986's "Born Yesterday". A 1981 live BBC recording of "All I Have to Do Is Dream", which featured Cliff Richard and Phil sharing vocals, was a UK Top 20 hit in 1994.

Paul McCartney has stated that the Everly Brothers were a major influence on the Beatles:

Solo work
Don found some success on the US country charts in the mid- to late-1970s, in Nashville with his band, Dead Cowboys, and playing with Albert Lee.

Don also performed solo at an annual country music festival in London in mid-1976. His appearance was well received, and he was given "thunderous applause", even though critics noted that the performance was uneven. Don recorded "Everytime You Leave" with Emmylou Harris on her 1979 album Blue Kentucky Girl.

Everly attended the Annual Music Masters as the Rock and Roll Hall of Fame paid homage to the Everly Brothers on October 25, 2014. Don took the State Theater stage and performed the Everlys' classic hit "Bye Bye Love".

Don stopped performing in 2018. His final performance was a guest appearance with Paul Simon on Simon's 2018 farewell tour in Nashville. Don and Simon performed “Bye Bye Love”, with Simon on Phil Everly's original tenor harmony.

Personal life
Everly was married to Mary Sue Ingraham from 1957 to 1961, Venetia Stevenson from 1962 to 1970, and Adela Garza from 1997, up until his death.

Don had four children, including Edan. Don graduated from West High School in 1955.

Don Everly publicly endorsed Hillary Clinton for the 2016 presidential election in January of that year. This marked the first time he had ever publicly supported a political candidate. Don stated that after his brother Phil's death, he felt free to express his views more openly, noting that the brothers' opposing views had made it impossible for them to lend active support to political candidates.

Death
Don died in Nashville, Tennessee. on August 21, 2021, aged 84 from undisclosed causes. His brother Phil had died in 2014. The Everly family matriarch, Margaret Embry Everly, died four months later in December aged 102.

Discography

The Everly Brothers

Solo

Albums

Singles

References

See also
 Phil Everly
 The Everly Brothers
 List of songs recorded by the Everly Brothers

1937 births
2021 deaths
American country singer-songwriters
20th-century American singers
Ode Records artists
Singers from Kentucky
21st-century American singers
American male singer-songwriters
People from Muhlenberg County, Kentucky
People from Shenandoah, Iowa
Singers from Iowa
Songwriters from Kentucky
20th-century American male writers
21st-century American male writers
Songwriters from Iowa
United States Marine Corps reservists
American male guitarists
Guitarists from Kentucky
Guitarists from Iowa
20th-century American guitarists
21st-century American guitarists
American country guitarists
American acoustic guitarists
American rockabilly guitarists